History of Modern (Part I) is a 2011 EP by English electronic band Orchestral Manoeuvres in the Dark (OMD), released on 2 March 2011 by 100% in the UK and Bright Antenna in the US. The EP was released as a digital download, CD and 10" record. Released after the 2011 LP History of Modern, it contains remixes as well as B-sides.

Track listings

CD
Side one
"History of Modern (Part I)" – 4:39
"History of Modern (Part II)" – 4:11
"History of Modern (Part III & IV)" – 2:03
"History of Modern (Part I)" (Krystal Klear Remix) – 4:55 
"History of Modern (Part I)" (Roger Erickson Remix) – 4:38 
"History of Modern (Part I)" (Selebrities Remix) – 4:21

Side two
"History of Modern (Part I)" (OMD's Extended Remix) – 5:32
"History of Modern (Part I)" (radio edit) – 3:12
"VCR" – 3:26
"The Grand Deception" – 3:26
"Idea 1" – 4:41
"Alone" – 4:22

10"
Side A
"History of Modern (Part I)" (radio edit) – 3:12
"History of Modern (Part I)" (OMD's Extended Remix) – 5:32

Side B
"The Grand Deception" – 3:26
"VCR" – 3:26
Note: The tracks "VCR" and "The Grand Deception" appear in reverse order on Side B due to either a printing or pressing error.

References

2011 EPs